Roselies is a village of Wallonia and district of the municipality of Aiseau-Presles in the province of Hainaut, Belgium.

It was a municipality before 1977.

Also known as 
Ban, Grand Pachi, Panama, Pauche, Petoi, Praile.

Former municipalities of Hainaut (province)